MV Empire Cross was a motor tanker that was built in England in 1945. She was launched as an Empire ship for the Ministry of War Transport (MoWT). In 1946 she exploded and sank in Haifa in Palestine, killing 25 of her crew.

Building and specifications
Sir James Laing & Sons Ltd built Empire Cross in its Deptford shipyard in Sunderland on the River Wear in County Durham. She was yard number 765. She was launched on 28 June 1945 and completed that November.

Empire Cross was an "intermediate tanker" for the MoWT.

William Doxford & Sons built her engine. It was a three-cylinder single-acting two-stroke diesel rated at 2,500 bhp.

Empire Cross had the UK official number 181112. Sources disagree as to whether her call sign was GDYW or GKLF.

Career
The MoWT appointed Hadley Shipping Co Ltd to manage Empire Cross. Hadley's registered her in Sunderland. In 1946 the MoWT transferred her management to Anglo-Saxon Petroleum, who transferred her registration to London.

Anglo-Saxon is part of Royal Dutch Shell. In accordance with standard Shell practice, Anglo-Saxon planned to rename the ship after a genus of mollusc: in this case Balea. However, the ship was lost before she could be renamed.

Loss

On 1 August 1946 Empire Cross arrived off Haifa in Palestine with a cargo of aviation spirit from Port Said in Egypt. On 2 August the ship was discharging her cargo in Haifa Roads. Empire Crosss Master, John Banks, heard the explosion of depth charges dropped by the destroyers to deter Haganah frogmen from trying to attach limpet mines to ships.

Empire Cross exploded and caught fire. Captain Banks gave the order to abandon ship. He dived overboard, swam under the flames until he lost consciousness, and was rescued by members of Haganah. Venus and Virago rescued other survivors. Between 30 and 40 people were rescued. The burning tanker capsized and sank.

Four people were found dead and 21 were listed as missing. The dead were reported to be nine of Empire Crosss British officers, 12 of her Lascar crew and four local Palestinian Arab labourers. Those dead whose bodies were found were buried at Haifa.

Suspected causes

A depth charge dropped by Virago was suspected of having caused the explosion. An inquest was held, at which the page in Viragos logbook for that day was found to be missing. However, the Admiralty dismissed the idea that a depth charge could have caused the explosion.

The news correspondent Clare Hollingworth, who at the time was in Palestine reporting for the News of the World, claimed that Haganah had blown up Empire Cross. A few days later a Haganah spokesman 'phoned the newspaper, denied the allegation, and accused Hollingworth of being "biased and motivated by hatred".

Salvage
In 1952 Empire Crosss wreck was raised and scrapped.

References

Bibliography

1945 ships
Empire ships
Maritime incidents in 1946
Merchant ships of the United Kingdom
Ship fires
Ships built on the River Wear
Ships of Anglo-Saxon Petroleum
Shipwrecks in the Mediterranean Sea
Tankers of the United Kingdom